The 8th Plenary Session of the Central Committee of the League of Communists of Serbia took place on 22 September 1987 in Belgrade, SR Serbia, SFR Yugoslavia. This session proved to be a turning point in Serbian politics, as it marked the rise of Slobodan Milošević as a key force in Serbian politics.

Background
The 8th Session of the League of Communists of Serbia (League of Communists of Yugoslavia's Serbian branch) took place against the backdrop of rising ethnic tensions between the Albanian and Serb communities in the Serbian province of Kosovo. General anti-Albanian feeling throughout Serbia was also high following the deadly crime in the dormitory of the Yugoslav People's Army (JNA) barracks in Paraćin on 3 September 1987. Known as the Paraćin massacre, it was committed by the 19-year-old ethnic Albanian recruit Aziz Kelmendi who randomly opened fire on his fellow soldiers, killing four of them and wounding further five. 

Ivan Stambolić was then the President of Serbia. His support a year earlier had helped Milošević become the chief of Serbian Communist Party, but he was becoming more and more opposed to Milošević. This was due to the latter's policy about dealing with Albanian unrest in Kosovo, which demanded rapid action instead of reaching a consensus through slow and patient negotiations with the Albanian leaders – a plan supported by Stambolić and his ally Dragiša Pavlović, leader of the Belgrade Communist Party. Stambolić was also unimpressed by Milošević's handling of a crowd in Kosovo, when he used the phrase "no one shall beat you again" that has since then become famous and also displayed open support for the Kosovo Serbs, against the party policy. This situation was worsened by Milošević's grudge against Pavlović, who highly disapproved of the Milošević camp and who had been appointed as the leader of the Belgrade Communist Party by Stambolić against the wishes of Milošević. Together, these factors ensured that the stage was set for a showdown between the two.

Days preceding the session
Milošević's handling of the Kosovo situation split the Serbian Communist Party into two groups. Pro-Pavlović/Stambolić group favoured negotiations with the Albanian leaders while the pro-Milošević group demanded quick and rapid action to end the "Kosovo problem". Pavlović's thinly veiled critical comments, accused Milošević of being an anti-Albanian Serb nationalist who's offering populist solutions to the Kosovo situation. Seeing the remarks as an attack, Milošević, together with his senior allies within the party, planned to expel Pavlović from the Communist Party. Pavlović, however, enjoyed the staunch support of Stambolić, the party's influential leader. Pavlović's expulsion from the party would effectively mean toppling Stambolić. Stambolić dispatched a letter to Pavlović asking the members of the party's Belgrade branch to stay out of it if the question was raised about Pavlović. This was a huge mistake as later this letter would cost Stambolić dearly. Also this letter raised many eyebrows among the Belgrade Party itself, who thought of this letter as unnecessary pressure by Stambolić. Milošević's supporters among the members of the Belgrade Communist Party, led by Dušan Mitević, were particularly angry at this.

On 18 September the Presidency of the Serbian Communist Party met. Stambolić tried hard to forge a compromise between the two groups, but now Milošević officially turned against Stambolić by calling Pavlović a threat to "ideological unity". But Milošević did not have any forces at that moment to outmanoeuvre Stambolić. He was bailed out of this situation by Dušan Mitević. Mitević, along with some members of the Belgrade Communist Party, drafted a letter to Milošević saying that the Belgrade Party committee had been pressurized by Stambolić into supporting Pavlović; they also sent Milošević the original letter by Stambolić. Next day, in front of about fifty members of the Communist Party, Milošević read the letter aloud. Members of the party, even those who were opposed to Milošević, were shocked at this revelation, even though plots were not uncommon among the party. In this case, however, Milošević had a written letter which he claimed was the proof of Stambolić putting personal interests ahead of those of the party. Stambolić felt betrayed by the same man who was once his best friend and whose rise to the top in the Serbian Communist Party he had engineered.

The day of the session
Milošević decided to broadcast the session live on television. Now it was an all or nothing game for Milošević. If the session went the way he wanted it to go, he would be successful in expelling Pavlović and toppling Stambolić, leaving himself in command, but if he failed it would mean an end to his career as Stambolić and his allies would crush Milošević and his allies. Milošević started by accusing Pavlović of being against the principles of the party and those of Yugoslavia and a threat to party unity. Then Milošević's allies accused Stambolić for acting like a dictator by trying to shut up the Belgrade Communist Party. Stambolić's letter had lost him and Pavlović support among even those who were not previously allied with Milošević. Stambolić replied by saying that Milošević was the one breaking unity. But by this time pre-arranged telegrams had started flocking in from the provinces and the Kosovo Serbs. A vote was called. Milošević won and Pavlović was expelled from the party.

Aftermath
The session ended with Milošević coming out stronger than ever and Pavlović expelled from the party. Pavlović left politics. Stambolić was publicly humiliated and weakened; even his allies lost their influence, and he was obliged to resign from the post of president of Serbia, which he did.

See also
Breakup of Yugoslavia
Role of Serb media in the 1991-1999 wars in the former Yugoslavia

References 

1987 in Serbia
Slobodan Milošević
1987 in politics
1987 conferences